Nivaldo Apolinar Rodríguez (born April 16, 1997) is a Venezuelan professional baseball pitcher for the Sultanes de Monterrey of the Mexican League. He previously played in Major League Baseball (MLB) for the Houston Astros.

Career

Houston Astros
Rodríguez signed with the Houston Astros as an international free agent on June 13, 2016. He spent the 2016 season with the DSL Astros, going 1–0 with a 1.17 ERA over  innings. He split the 2017 season between the DSL and the GCL Astros, going a combined 4–2 with a 2.05 ERA over 57 innings. he spent the 2018 season with the Tri City ValleyCats, going 4–1 with a 2.91 ERA over  innings. He split the 2019 season between the Quad Cities River Bandits and the Fayetteville Woodpeckers, going a combined 6–6 with a 2.40 ERA over 105 innings.

Rodríguez was added to the Astros 40-man roster after the 2019 season. He made his MLB debut on July 28, 2020 against the Los Angeles Dodgers.

On July 31, 2021, Rodríguez was designated for assignment by the Astros.

Detroit Tigers
On August 2, 2021, Rodríguez was claimed off of waivers by the Detroit Tigers. He was assigned to the Triple-A Toledo Mud Hens. Rodríguez posted a 4.93 ERA in 13 appearances for Toledo. He was outrighted off of the 40-man roster following the season on November 19, 2021.

He was assigned to the Triple-A Toledo Mud Hens to begin the 2022 season. He appeared in 19 games (15 starts), struggling to a 3-8 record and 6.92 ERA with 49 strikeouts in 65.0 innings pitched. He was released on August 4, 2022.

Sioux City Explorers
On August 14, 2022, Rodríguez signed with the Sioux City Explorers of the American Association of Professional Baseball. He made five starts for the team down the stretch, recording a 3-1 record and 1.50 ERA with 40 strikeouts in 30.0 innings of work.

Sultanes de Monterrey
On February 20, 2023, Rodríguez signed with the Sultanes de Monterrey of the Mexican League.

International career
Rodríguez was selected for the Venezuela national baseball team at the 2018 U-23 Baseball World Cup.

References

External links

1997 births
Living people
Dominican Summer League Astros players
Venezuelan expatriate baseball players in the Dominican Republic
Fayetteville Woodpeckers players
Gulf Coast Astros players
Houston Astros players
Major League Baseball pitchers
Major League Baseball players from Venezuela
People from Carabobo
Quad Cities River Bandits players
Sugar Land Skeeters players
Tri-City ValleyCats players
Venezuela national baseball team players
Venezuelan expatriate baseball players in the United States
Expatriate baseball players in Puerto Rico
Criollos de Caguas players